The 2011 Individual Speedway Junior World Championship was the 35th edition of the FIM World motorcycle speedway Under-21 Championships.

The event final was increased from three races to four races between 23 July and 9 October 2011. Maciej Janowski of Poland became the new champion.

Qualification 

In five Qualifying round will started 80 riders and to Semi-finals will qualify top 6 from each meetings. This 30 riders and 2 riders from Semi-final' host federations will started in two Semi-finals. The top 7 riders from both SF will automatically qualify for all Final meetings.

Riders 
There will be fourteen permanent riders (riders placed 1st to 7th in both semi finals will automatically qualify for all Final meetings). Two Wild Card riders will be nominated to each final meeting (approval and nomination by CCP Bureau). Two Track Reserve riders will be nominated by national federation.

In case of the absence of one or more riders in the final meetings, the first available Qualified Substitute rider or riders will be elevated for that meeting, and take the place(s) of the relevant
missing rider(s). The list of Qualified Substitute riders will be published by the CCP after the Semi-finals.

A starting position draw for each final meeting will be balloted by the FIM.

Final Series

Classification 
The meeting classification will be according to the points scored during the meeting (heats 1–20). The total points scored by each rider during each final meeting (heat 1–20) will be credited also as World Championship points. The FIM Speedway Under 21 World Champion will be the rider having collected most World Championship points at the end of the series. In case of a tie between one or more riders in the final overall classification, a run-off will decide the 1st, 2nd and 3rd place. For all other placings, the better-placed rider in the last final meeting will be the better placed rider.

See also 
 2011 Speedway Grand Prix
 2011 Team Speedway Junior World Championship

References 

 
2011
World Individual Junior